Hansi Bochow-Blüthgen (2 January 1897 in Berlin-Charlottenburg – 30 August 1983 in Munich; actually Hanna Dora Margarethe, née Blüthgen; pen name: Lore Wiesner) was a German writer, editor, and translator in the Post-war years.

Life and work 
Bochow-Blüthgen, was married to the journalist Friedrich Walter Bochow (1889–1946) from the mid-1920s, was the granddaughter of the illustrator Fedor Flinzer and niece of the lyricist Victor Blüthgen (1844–1920).
The photographer Gisèle Freund and the writer Moshe Ya'akov Ben-Gavriel (1891–1965), who dedicated Bochow-Blüthgen his story Ein Löwe hat den Mond verschluckt, were among her friends.

Bochow-Blüthgen worked on their first training as a librarian. She gained recognition through numerous translations from English and American. Among her best known translations into German is Frühstück bei Tiffany (Breakfast at Tiffany's) by Truman Capote. Her sensitive translation was very successful and is yet available. However, it was called advanced in years (betagt) in the Frankfurter Allgemeine Zeitung half a century after publication. Another famous translation from Bochow-Blüthgen is Der Kardinal (The Cardinal) by Henry Morton Robinson. 50 years after its appearance on the German book market, it was characterized as a Bestseller in best translation ("Bestseller in Bestübersetzung) in the Süddeutsche Zeitung.
Further translations from Bochow-Blüthgen are Praterveilchen (Prater Violet) by Christopher Isherwood, Sturmwind – Flickas Sohn (Thunderhead) by Mary O'Hara, and Tien Pao ein Chinesenjunge (The House of Sixty Fathers) by Meindert DeJong. Apart from this, Bochow-Blüthgen translated texts by William Makepeace Thackeray, Katherine Anne Porter, and Patricia Highsmith into German.

 Notes 

 Works (selection) 

Biggers, Earl Derr, Das schwarze Kamel (The Black Camel), Leipzig: Ernst Oldenburg 1930
Caldwell, Taylor, Melissa, Berlin: Blanvalet 1950
Capote, Truman, Frühstück bei Tiffany (Breakfast at Tiffany's), Wiesbaden: Limes 1959
Capote, Truman, Lokalkolorit (Local Color), Wiesbaden: Limes 1960
Capote, Truman, Die Musen sprechen. Mit Porgy and Bess in Rußland (The Muses Are Heard), Wiesbaden: Limes 1961
Dedijer, Vladimir, Tito, Berlin: Ullstein 1953
DeJong, Meindert, Tien Pao, ein Chinesenjunge. Eine ergreifende Geschichte (The House of Sixty Fathers), Köln: Schaffstein 1958
Forbes, Kathryn, Mamas Bankkonto (Mama's Bank Account), Berlin: Ullstein/Kindler 1946
Isherwood, Christopher, Praterveilchen (Prater Violet), Hamburg: Rowohlt Verlag 1953
James, Henry, Patina (The Tone of Time), Norderstedt: Books on Demand 2009, 
O'Hara, Mary, Sturmwind – Flickas Sohn (Thunderhead), Wiesbaden: Rheinische Verlags-Anstalt 1953
Porter, Katharine Anne, Das letzte Blatt (The Leaning Tower), Bad Wörishofen: Kindler und Schiermeyer Verlag 1953
Porter, Katharine Anne, Unter heißem Himmel (Flowering Judas), Bad Wörishofen: Kindler und Schiermeyer Verlag 1951
Robinson, Henry Morton, Der Kardinal (The Cardinal), Frankfurt am Main: Verlag der Frankfurter Hefte 1950
Thackeray, William Makepeace, Jahrmarkt der Eitelkeit (Vanity Fair), Berlin: Wegweiser Verlag/Volksverband der Bücherfreunde 1949
Uris, Leon, Die Berge standen auf (The Angry Hills), München: Kindler 1963 
Whitfield, Raoul, Grünes Eis (Green Ice), Leipzig: Ernst Oldenburg 1931

 Secondary literature (selection) 
Habel, Walter (ed.): Wer ist wer?, vol. 13, Berlin 1958, p 103.
Schuder, Werner (ed.): Kürschners Deutscher Literatur-Kalender 1967, vol. 55, Berlin 1967, p 80.
Pommer, Ursula: In 56 Tagen den "Kardinal" übersetzt, in: Börsenblatt für den Deutschen Buchhandel (1976), no. 102, p 1911–1913.
Bochow-Blüthgen, Hansi: Vom heute und vom Jahre Null, in: Die Begegnung, vol. 13 (1977), p 9–14.
Winter, Helmut: Die Not des Exils/Christopher Isherwood: "Praterveilchen", in: Neue Zürcher Zeitung, 21 Oktober 1998, p 47.
Bedürftig, Friedemann: Ein Bestseller in Bestübersetzung. Lektüre für das Heilige Jahr: Vor fünfzig Jahren erschien Henry Morton Robinsons Roman "Der Kardinal", in: Süddeutsche Zeitung, SZ am Wochenende, no. 190, 19/20 August 2000, p III.
Schneider, Wolfgang: Im Bett mit Holly Golightly. Schlabberei: Truman Capotes "Frühstück bei Tiffany", in: Frankfurter Allgemeine Zeitung'', no. 18, 22 January 2005, p 34.

External links 

1897 births
1983 deaths
19th-century German people
20th-century German people
Writers from Berlin
Writers from Munich
Translators to German
19th-century German writers
20th-century German writers
20th-century German women writers
19th-century German women writers
20th-century translators
19th-century translators
People from Charlottenburg